Flight Lieutenant Geoffrey William Hemming  (3 April 1898 – 26 February 1926) was a British World War I flying ace credited with six aerial victories.

World War I service

He joined No. 4 Naval Squadron just after its second formation in December 1916. It was equipped with Sopwith Pups, and based at Ostend, Belgium. On 12 May 1917 Hemming piloted Pup No. N6177 to victory over a Siemens-Schuckert D.I, destroying it. He switched to No. N6199 for his victories on 6 June, when he destroyed another Siemens Schuckert D.I, and drove a third one down out of control. He then upgraded to Sopwith Camel No. B3841 for his triple win on 22 August 1917, when he drove down three Albatros D.Vs out of control.

Hemming was awarded the Distinguished Service Cross, which was gazetted in November 1917. His citation read:
Flight Sub-Lieutenant Geoffrey William Hemming, R.N.A.S.
"In recognition of his services with a Wing of the R.N.A.S. at Dunkirk between March and September, 1917, during which period he has been continuously employed on the Belgian coast, and on many occasions has been in charge of a flight. On the 22nd September, 1917, he led his flight against a formation of twenty enemy aircraft, and engaging three consecutively, brought them all down".

He was promoted to flight lieutenant on 1 January 1918, and on 22 February he was granted permission to wear the insignia of the Croix de guerre and of a commander of the Order of the Crown, which had been conferred by the King of the Belgians.

On 12 September 1919 Hemming was granted a short service commission in the Royal Air Force with the rank of flying officer.

On 7 August 1924 he was posted to the Marine Aircraft Experimental Establishment at Felixstowe.
On 1 January 1925 he was promoted to flight lieutenant, and on 16 February 1925 posted to No. 480 Flight, based at RAF Calshot. Hemming died following a flying accident in a Fairey IIID at Calshot on 26 February 1926. His passenger Flying Officer Robert Collins was seriously injured, and died two days later.

Personal life
Geoffrey Hemming married Dorothy May Woods, daughter of Mr. and Mrs R. J. Woods, of Princetown Lodge, Bangor, County Down, on 7 February 1923 at St. Comgall's Parish Church, Bangor, County Down.

References

1898 births
1926 deaths
People from Droitwich Spa
Royal Naval Air Service personnel of World War I
Royal Air Force personnel of World War I
British World War I flying aces
Recipients of the Distinguished Service Cross (United Kingdom)
Recipients of the Croix de guerre (Belgium)
Commanders of the Order of the Crown (Belgium)
Recipients of the Croix de Guerre 1914–1918 (France)
Aviators killed in aviation accidents or incidents in England